Tokyo Muzical Hotel (typeset in promotional material as TOKYO MUZiCAL HOTEL) is the second full-length album by Sug. It is the band's first album release since their major label debut on Pony Canyon. It was released on March 9, 2010 in two editions: one limited edition, which includes an exclusive DVD with the music video for "dot.0", and a regular edition that features 5 extra tracks not available in the limited edition.

The album charted in the top 30 of the Oricon daily rankings upon release.

Track listing

Limited edition
Disk one (CD)
"Gr8 Story" - 3:30
"Life♥2Die (album mix)" - 3:07
"Block Party MonstAr" - 3:45
"39GalaxyZ (album mix)" - 3:57
"武士道 -bushido- Freaky" - 3:37
"Umbilical (new arrange version)" - 3:52
"Kaori" (薫) - 5:55
"P!NK masquerade. (album mix)" - 3:37
"L.E.D Ghosty" - 3:42
"Karma Discord" - 3:36
"16bit HERO 2" - 1:47
"little lover boy" - 3:29
"dot.0" - 5:32

Disk two (DVD)
"dot.0" - 5:32

Regular edition
"million $ orchestra" - 1:10
"gr8 story" - 3:30
"Life♥2Die (album mix)" - 3:07
"Block Party MonstAr" - 3:45
"early morning children" - 0:29
"39GalaxyZ (album mix)" - 3:57
"武士道 -bushido- Freaky" - 3:37
"sweet box refrain" - 0:38
"Umbilical (new arrange version)" - 3:52
"Kaori" (薫) - 5:55
"industrial police" - 0:56
"P!NK masquerade. (album mix)" - 3:37
"L.E.D Ghosty" - 3:42
"Karma Discord" - 3:36
"super kawaiiii" - 0:58
"16bit HERO 2" - 1:47
"little lover boy" - 3:29
"dot.0" - 5:32

References

External links
 Official PS Company website

Sug albums
2010 albums
Pony Canyon albums